Rifargia lineata is a species of moth in the family Notodontidae (the prominents). It was first described by Druce in 1887 and it is found in North America.

The MONA or Hodges number for Rifargia lineata is 7967.

References

Further reading

External links

 

Notodontidae
Articles created by Qbugbot
Moths described in 1887